Kaštiliašu III, inscribed phonetically in cuneiform as mKaš-til-ia-šu, is a possible Kassite king of Babylonia in the 15th century BC (Short Chronology). He is known only from the Assyrian Synchronistic King List, a copy of a monumental inscription, which gives his genealogy, and references in the Chronicle of Early Kings.

Sources

Evidence of Kaštiliašu's kingship is somewhat circumstantial. He may be the person indicated on line 21’ of the Synchronistic King List where he is placed opposite Assyrian king Aššur-nārāri I and is preceded by a lacuna and superseded by a poorly preserved name which is not thought to be Ulam-Buriaš. Two passages in the Chronicle of Early Kings mention Kaštiliašu: "Ulam-Buriaš, brother of Kaštiliašu, the Kassite" and "Agum, the son of Kaštiliašu". (Ulam-Buriaš conquered and ruled the Sealand—at the southern end of Babylonia—and perhaps ruled as king of Babylonia; Agum (III) was king of Babylonia.) He has no royal title in those, a feature of this chronicle that is shared by others, such as Samsu-Ditana, who, despite absent monarchical epithets, did prove to be kings.

A recently published copy of a monumental inscription  celebrates his excavation of the Sumundar Canal and confirms his genealogy, son of Burnaburiaš I, grandson of Agum II. It describes his ritual use of a silver spade and basket, which were subsequently displayed in the temple of Enlil, and his conscription of the people and land of Yamutbal for its excavation. Although he is designated as šakkanak Enlil, “governor of Enlil”, the title and subsequent elaborate curse formula against those who might later efface the inscription implies his regnal status.

Inscriptions

Notes

References

16th-century BC Babylonian kings
15th-century BC Babylonian kings
Kassite kings
15th-century BC people